Jean Baptiste Marie Joseph Solange Eugène Ripart (15 May 1815, Bessines – 17 October 1878, Bourges) was a French physician, botanist and mycologist.

During his career he worked as a physician in Bourges. He conducted investigations of cryptogams and performed research of the genera Rosa and Rubus. With Pierre Alfred Déséglise (Rosa) and Léon Gaston Genevier (Rubus), he described numerous botanical species.

The mycological genera of Ripartitella  and Ripartites  as well as the former plant genus Ripartia  (which is now a synonym of Rosa,), all commemorate his name.

Published works 
 "Notice sur la fontaine de Saint-Firmin ou Fontaine-de-fer, sur la composition de ses eaux, leurs propriétés", (1852).

References 

1814 births
1878 deaths
People from Haute-Vienne
French mycologists
19th-century French botanists